Jon Pedersen (born 18 June 1957) is a Danish equestrian. He competed at the 2000 Summer Olympics and the 2004 Summer Olympics.

References

External links
 

1957 births
Living people
Danish male equestrians
Olympic equestrians of Denmark
Equestrians at the 2000 Summer Olympics
Equestrians at the 2004 Summer Olympics
People from Silkeborg
Sportspeople from the Central Denmark Region